Medora is a village in Macoupin County, Illinois, United States. The population was 379 at the 2020 census, down from 419 in 2010.

Geography
Medora is located along the western edge of Macoupin County at  (39.176063, -90.141801). The village's western border is the Jersey County line. Illinois Routes 111 and 267 pass through the east side of the village. Together the highways lead south  to Brighton. Route 267 leads north  to Greenfield, while Route 111 leads northeast  to Chesterfield.

The village drains northwest to a tributary of Macoupin Creek, part of the Illinois River watershed.

Demographics

As of the census of 2000, there were 501 people, 175 households, and 131 families residing in the village. The racial makeup of the village was 96.81% White, 0.20% Native American, 0.20% Asian, 1.20% from other races, and 1.60% from two or more races. Hispanic or Latino of any race were 1.60% of the population.

There were 175 households, of which 42.3% had children under the age of 18 living with them, 61.1% were married couples living together, 9.7% had a female householder with no husband present, and 25.1% were non-families. 23.4% of all households were made up of individuals, and 14.9% had someone living alone who was 65 years of age or older. The average household size was 2.86 and the average family size was 3.39.

In the village, the population was spread out, with 32.7% under the age of 18, 9.0% from 18 to 24, 26.7% from 25 to 44, 19.4% from 45 to 64, and 12.2% who were 65 years of age or older. The median age was 32 years. For every 100 females, there were 86.9 males. For every 100 females age 18 and over, there were 88.3 males.

The median income for a household in the village was $26,583, and the median income for a family was $28,750. Males had a median income of $35,000 versus $19,063 for females. The per capita income for the village was $11,052. About 10.0% of families and 12.4% of the population were below the poverty line, including 13.0% of those under age 18 and 28.6% of those age 65 or over.

References

Villages in Macoupin County, Illinois
Villages in Illinois